South Shields power station supplied electricity to the borough of South Shields and the surrounding area from 1896 to 1958. It was owned and operated by South Shields Corporation until the nationalisation of the British electricity supply industry in 1948. The power station was redeveloped several times to meet increasing demand It was decommissioned in 1958.

History
In 1891 South Shields Corporation applied for a Provisional Order under the Electric Lighting Acts to generate and supply electricity to the town. This was granted by the Board of Trade and was confirmed by Parliament through the Electric Lighting Orders Confirmation (No. 4) Act 1891 (54 & 55 Vict. c. lii). The power station was built in West Holborn South Shields (54°59'27"N 1°26'42"W) and first supplied electricity in September 1896.

Equipment specification
The original plant at South Shields power station comprised triple open-type marine engines, vertical surface condensing, coupled directly to Ferranti dynamos. In 1898 the generating capacity was 415 kW and the maximum load was 127 kW.

Plant in 1923
By 1923 the generating plant comprised:

 Coal-fired boilers generating up to 135,000 lb/h (17 kg/s) of steam, which was supplied to:
 Generators
 1 × 200 kW reciprocating engine AC
 2 × 500 kW reciprocating engines AC
 2 × 550 kW reciprocating engines DC
 1 × 750 kW steam turbine dual AC and DC
 1 × 2,000 kW steam turbo-alternator AC
 1 × 3,000 kW steam turbo-alternator AC

These machines gave a total generating capacity of 6,950 kW of alternating current and 1,850 kW direct current.

A variety of electricity supplies were available to consumers as:

 Single phase, 50 Hz AC, at 110 and 220 Volts
 3-phase, 50 Hz AC at 2,100 Volts
 DC 500 Volts

Operations

Operating data 1898
In 1898 the undertaking’s 90 customers were sold 82,172 kWh of electricity, plus 41,729 kWh for public lighting. These sales generated a revenue for the Corporation of £4,842.

Operating data 1921–23
The operating data for the period 1921–23 was:

Under the terms of the Electricity (Supply) Act 1926 (16 & 17 Geo. 5 c. 51) the Central Electricity Board (CEB) was established in 1926. The CEB identified high efficiency ‘selected’ power stations that would supply electricity most effectively. The CEB also constructed the national grid (1927–33) to connect power stations within a region.

Operating data 1946
South Shields power station had a maximum output load of 10,972 MW and delivered 10,092 MWh of electricity in 1946.

The British electricity supply industry was nationalised in 1948 under the provisions of the Electricity Act 1947 (10 & 11 Geo. 6 c. 54). The South Shields electricity undertaking was abolished, ownership of South Shields power station was vested in the British Electricity Authority, and subsequently the Central Electricity Authority and the Central Electricity Generating Board (CEGB). At the same time the electricity distribution and sales responsibilities of the South Shields electricity undertaking were transferred to the North Eastern Electricity Board (NEEB).

Operating data 1954–58 
Operating data for the period 1954–58 was:

South Shields was an electricity supply district, covering the 4,874 acres (1,972 ha) of the County Borough of South Shields with a population of 108,300 in 1958. The number of consumers and electricity sold was:

In 1958 the number of units sold to categories of consumers was:

There were 328 miles (528 km) of high voltage mains in the district comprising 324 miles (521 km) of underground mains and 4 miles (6.4 km) of overhead cables.

Closure
South Shields power station was decommissioned on 30 September 1958. The buildings were subsequently demolished and the area is derelict.

See also
 Timeline of the UK electricity supply industry
 List of power stations in England

References

Coal-fired power stations in England
Demolished power stations in the United Kingdom
Former power stations in England
Buildings and structures in South Shields